Penwartha is a hamlet between Perranzabuloe and  Perrancoombe in Cornwall, England.

References

Hamlets in Cornwall